Crumpler is an unincorporated community on North Carolina Highway 16 in Ashe County, North Carolina, United States.  It is located east of Warrensville, northeast of Jefferson, and north of Chestnut Hill, at an elevation of 2559 feet (780 m).  The ZIP Code for Crumpler is 28617.

History
The Shubal V. Alexander Archeological District, Brinegar District, John M. Pierce House, and Thompson's Bromine and Arsenic Springs are listed on the National Register of Historic Places.

References
Specific citations

General references

Unincorporated communities in Ashe County, North Carolina
Unincorporated communities in North Carolina